The following highways are numbered 572:

United States